Samuel Hart (1845–1917) was an American Episcopal clergyman, classicist, and liturgical scholar.

Biography
Samuel Hart was born at Old Saybrook, Connecticut on June 4, 1845. He graduated from Trinity College in 1866, after 1868 taught at that institution, and was made professor of Latin in 1883. He had been ordained priest in 1870, and in 1893 he was elected Bishop of Vermont, but declined the office. In 1886, he became custodian of the Standard Prayer-Book of his church, and in 1892 secretary of the House of Bishops. In 1899 he became vice dean and professor of doctrinal theology and the Prayer-Book, and in 1908 dean, at the Berkeley Divinity School, then in Middletown, Connecticut. He was elected president of the American Philological Association in 1891.

He died in Middletown, Connecticut on February 25, 1917.

Publications
He published editions of Juvenal (1873) and Persius (1875); edited Bishop Seabury's Communion Office (1874) and Historical Sermons of Bishop Seabury (1883–1886); and wrote on The Book of Common Prayer (1910) and Faith and the Faith (the Bohlen lectures, 1914).

References

External links
 
 

American philologists
American religious writers
People from Deep River, Connecticut
1845 births
1917 deaths
American Episcopal priests
Trinity College (Connecticut) alumni
Anglican liturgists
19th-century American Episcopalians